The Siege is a 1998 American action thriller film directed by Edward Zwick. The film is about a fictional situation in which terrorist cells have made several attacks in New York City. The film stars Denzel Washington, Annette Bening, Tony Shalhoub, and Bruce Willis.

Plot
FBI Special Agent Anthony Hubbard and his Lebanese American partner Frank Haddad intervene at the hijacking of a bus fully loaded with passengers, which contains an explosive device. The bomb turns out to be a paint bomb and the terrorists escape. The FBI receives demands to release Sheikh Ahmed bin Talal, a suspect in an earlier bombing. Hubbard eventually comes into conflict with Central Intelligence Agency operative Elise Kraft as he takes a terrorist suspect into custody and arrests Kraft. Later, another terrorist threat is made and a Metropolitan Transportation Authority bus is bombed. FBI captures a man named Samir Nazhde, who admits to signing the visa application of one of the suicide bombers in the course of signing many applications for student visas in his job as a lecturer. However, Kraft insists that Samir is not a terrorist and that his continued freedom is vital to the investigation.

The terrorist incidents escalate with the bombing of a bus and a crowded theater and hostage-situation at an elementary school, and culminate in the destruction of One Federal Plaza, the location of the FBI's New York City field office, with over 600 casualties. In spite of objections, the President of the United States declares martial law and the United States Army's 101st Airborne Division, under General William Devereaux, occupies and seals off Brooklyn in an effort to find the remaining terrorist cells. Subsequently, all young men of Arab descent, including Haddad's son Frank Jr., are rounded up and detained in Downing Stadium. Haddad resigns in outrage. New Yorkers stage violent demonstrations against the Army and the profiling of the Arabs; the Army fights to maintain control. There are reports of Army killings.

Hubbard and Kraft, now revealed to be an intelligence operative named Sharon Bridger, continue their investigation and capture a suspect, Tariq Husseini. Devereaux's men torture and kill Husseini in the course of the interrogation. Afterward, Bridger tells Hubbard that Husseini revealed nothing of value because of the principle of compartmentalized information. Sickened, she finally admits that she herself provided training and support to militants opposed to Saddam Hussein's regime, working with Samir to recruit and train the followers of the Sheikh. After the U.S. cut their funding and left them exposed, she took pity on the few of them who had not yet been slaughtered by Hussein's forces, and arranged for them to escape to the United States, ultimately leading to the present situation as they turn their bomb making and covert skills on the country that now holds their leader. She and Hubbard compel Samir to arrange a meeting with the final terrorist cell. Hubbard convinces Haddad to return to the FBI.

A multi-ethnic peace march demonstrates against the occupation of Brooklyn. As the march is getting under way Hubbard and Haddad arrive at the meeting place, but Bridger and Samir have already left. Samir reveals to Bridger that he constitutes the final cell while in another sense he says, "there will never be a last cell." He straps a bomb to his body which he intends to detonate among the marchers. Hubbard and Haddad arrive in time to prevent him from leaving but Samir shoots Bridger in the stomach as she struggles to stop him. Hubbard and Haddad kill Samir but despite their best efforts the pair can only watch as Bridger succumbs to her wound after managing to recite certain lines of the second half of the Lord's Prayer and concluding with "Inshallah" – the Arabic phrase "God Willing".

Hubbard, Haddad, and their team raid Devereaux's headquarters to make an arrest for the torture and murder of Husseini. Deveraux insists that under the War Powers Resolution the authority vested in himself by the President supersedes that of the court which issued the arrest warrant. He then commands his soldiers to aim their assault rifles at the agents, resulting in a Mexican standoff. Hubbard reminds Devereaux that the civil liberties and human rights which he took from Husseini are what all his predecessors have fought and died for. Devereaux finally submits and is arrested. Martial law ends and the detainees, including Haddad's son, are given their freedom.

Cast 
 Denzel Washington as FBI Assistant Special Agent in Charge Anthony 'Hub' Hubbard
 Annette Bening as CIA Operative Sharon Bridger / Elise Kraft 
 Bruce Willis as U.S. Army General Bill Devereaux
 Tony Shalhoub as FBI Special Agent Frank Haddad
 Aasif Mandvi as Khalil Saleh
 Amro Salama as Tariq Husseini
 Sami Bouajila as Samir Nazhde
 Ahmed Ben Larby as Sheik Akhmed Bin Talal
 Lianna Pai as FBI Agent Tina Osu
 Mark Valley as FBI Agent Mike Johanssen
 David Proval as FBI Agent Danny Sussman
 Lance Reddick as FBI Agent Floyd Rose
 Lisa Lynn Masters as Reporter

Reception

Critical response 
The film received mixed reviews from critics. Rotten Tomatoes awards the film a score of 44% based on 62 reviews. The site's consensus states: "An exciting, well-paced action film." Audiences polled by CinemaScore gave the film an average grade of "B−" on an A+ to F scale.

Roger Ebert gave the film 2 stars out of four, writing that director Edward Zwick does a good job with crowd scenes, but criticizing it as clumsy.

Bruce Willis won the Golden Raspberry Award for Worst Actor for his performances in this film, Armageddon, and Mercury Rising.

Box office 
The film grossed $40,981,289 in North America and $75,691,623 in other territories on a budget of $70 million. In the film's second week, The Siege showed the teaser trailer for Star Wars: Episode I – The Phantom Menace.

Controversy 
When the film opened, the American-Arab Anti-Discrimination Committee came out against the film. Its spokesman Hussein Ibish said "The Siege is extremely offensive. It's beyond offensive. We're used to offensive, that's become a daily thing. This is actually dangerous." He thought it was "Insidious and incendiary" because it "reinforces stereotypes that lead to hate crimes." Ibish acknowledged that Arab terrorists did, in fact, bomb the World Trade Center in 1993, but said that Arab and Islamic groups are upset by "the very strong equation between Muslim religious practices and terrorism. ...[Thanks to this film] Every time someone goes through the Muslim ablution, the ritual washing of hands everybody does before they pray five times a day, that image is the announcement to the viewer of the presence of violence." Echoing such criticism, the Council on American–Islamic Relations protested the insinuation that "Muslims have total disregard for human life." The groups were "faxing and calling news organizations on a regular basis" to voice their concerns.

Director Edward Zwick had met with Arab Americans, who suggested that the story be changed to mirror the aftermath of the Oklahoma City bombing, when Arabs were immediately assumed responsible. This idea was rejected.  Zwick noted that The Sieges villains also include members of the U.S. government, and dismissed the criticism, saying: 

In a September 2007 interview, screenwriter Lawrence Wright attributed the film's failure at the box office to Muslim and Arab protests at theaters playing the film, but also claimed that it was the most rented movie in America after the September 11 attacks.

Scholar Moustafa Bayoumi has also critiqued the racialization of Arabs in the film and suggests it is indicative of an emerging sub-genre defined by "the notion of African-American leadership of the Arab world, intertwined with friendship with it."

Scholar Alexandra Campbell quoted from former Guantanamo Bay detention camp captive Tarek Dergoul when she compared the fictional demonization and extrajudicial abuse of Muslims in the film and the abuse that Dergoul described in his first post-repatriation interview.

On July 12, 2006 the magazine Mother Jones provided excerpts from the transcripts of a selection of the Guantánamo detainees. Yunis Abdurrahman Shokuri was one of the detainees profiled. According to the article, his transcript contained the following comment:

References

External links

 
 
 
 

1998 films
1998 action thriller films
American action thriller films
American political thriller films
1990s English-language films
Films about the Federal Bureau of Investigation
Films about the United States Army
Films set in New York City
Films about race and ethnicity
Films about terrorism in the United States
Films about jihadism
20th Century Fox films
Films directed by Edward Zwick
Films produced by Lynda Obst
Golden Raspberry Award winning films
Films scored by Graeme Revell
1990s American films